The St. Johns National Wildlife Refuge is part of the United States National Wildlife Refuge System, located off SR 50 just west of Titusville. The 6,255 acre (25 km2) refuge was established in 1971 to protect the now extinct dusky seaside sparrow, Ammodramus maritimus nigrescens. It is administered as part of Merritt Island National Wildlife Refuge.

External links
 St. Johns National Wildlife Refuge at U.S. Fish and Wildlife Service

Protected areas of Brevard County, Florida
National Wildlife Refuges in Florida
Protected areas established in 1971